Elections for the members of the House of Representatives were held on June 2, 1931 pursuant to the Philippine Organic Act of 1902, which prescribed elections for every three years. The ruling Nacionalista Consolidado retained their majority in the House of Representatives.

Results
{| width=69% 
|-
|+ ↓
|-align=center
|
|-
|

References

  

1931
History of the Philippines (1898–1946)
Philippines
1931 in the Philippines
June 1931 events